Célestin Nollet (6 February 1894 – 14 August 1975) was a Belgian footballer. He played in two matches for the Belgium national football team in 1922.

References

External links
 

1894 births
1975 deaths
Belgian footballers
Belgium international footballers
Place of birth missing
Association footballers not categorized by position